The United States District Court for the Eastern District of New York (in case citations, E.D.N.Y.)  is the federal district court whose territorial jurisdiction spans five counties in New York State: the four Long Island counties of Nassau, Suffolk, Kings (Brooklyn), and Queens, as well as Richmond (Staten Island), the latter three being among New York City's five boroughs. The court also has concurrent jurisdiction with the Southern District of New York over the waters of New York (Manhattan) and Bronx Counties (including New York Harbor and the East River). Its courthouses are located in Brooklyn and Central Islip.

Appeals from the Eastern District of New York are taken to the United States Court of Appeals for the Second Circuit (except for patent claims and claims against the U.S. government under the Tucker Act, which are appealed to the Federal Circuit).

The United States Attorney's Office for the Eastern District of New York represents the United States in civil and criminal litigation in the court. The United States Attorney for the Eastern District of New York since October 2021 is Breon S. Peace. The U.S. Marshal for the court is Vincent F. DeMarco.

Courthouses 

The main location is the Theodore Roosevelt Federal Courthouse at 225 Cadman Plaza East in the civic center of Brooklyn. The 15-story building was designed by Cesar Pelli. The courthouse was designed in 1995 but did not open until 2006 following redesign requirements in the wake of the Oklahoma City bombing and the September 11 attacks. It replaced the six story Emanuel Celler Federal Building (built in 1962 and located next door and connected via glass atrium). In 2008 it was renamed for Theodore Roosevelt. The building was originally to be renamed in honor of former New York Governor Hugh Carey but politicians backed off because Carey was alive at the time. The associated prison is the Metropolitan Detention Center, Brooklyn.

The Divisional office is in the Alfonse M. D'Amato United States Courthouse in Central Islip, New York. The courthouse designed by Richard Meier opened in 2000 and is the largest building on Long Island. The 12-story building has , 23 courtrooms and 24 judges' chambers.
It is the third largest federal courthouse in the United States (after the Daniel Patrick Moynihan United States Courthouse and Thomas F. Eagleton United States Courthouse).

Current judges 
:

Vacancies and pending nominations

Former judges

Chief judges

Succession of seats

See also 
 Courts of New York
 List of current United States district judges
 List of United States federal courthouses in New York
 Trump–Ukraine scandal

References

External links 
 United States District Court for the Eastern District of New York Official Website
 United States Attorney for the Eastern District of New York Official Website

New York, Eastern District
New York (state) law
Brooklyn
Islip (town), New York
Buildings and structures in Suffolk County, New York
1865 establishments in New York (state)
Courthouses in New York (state)
Courts and tribunals established in 1865